Košarkaški klub Sveti Đorđe, commonly referred to as KK Sveti Đorđe, is a men's professional basketball club based in Žitište, Serbia. They are currently competing in the First Regional League of Serbia (3rd-tier).

The club was founded in 1979 and renamed in 2001 after Saint George. The club has its own Hall of Fame, where the members are Drago Radinović, Zoran Veselinov and Nikola Pešut.

History 
In the 2018–19 Cup of Serbia, Sveti Đorđe as a 3rd-tier league member won over Zdravlje (2nd-tier league member) in the quarterfinals and over Vojvodina (1st-tier league member) in the semifinals. Those wins took them to the 2019 Cup of Serbia Final and qualifies to the 2019 Radivoj Korać Cup. Sveti Đorđe lost from Novi Pazar in the Cup of Serbia Final.

Players

Coaches 

  Dušan Radojčić
  Nebojša Vidić 
  Marko Boljac 
  Nenad Vignjević

Trophies and awards

Trophies 
 Cup of Serbia (2nd-tier)
 Runners-up: 2018–19
 Radivoj Korać Cup 
 Quarterfinals: 2019

References

External links
  
 Profile at srbijasport.net 
 Profile at eurobasket.com

Žitište
Sveti Dorde
Sveti Dorde
Basketball teams established in 1979
1979 establishments in Serbia